Stefan Naumov - Stiv (27 October 192012 September 1942, Macedonian: Стефан Наумов - Стив) was a Macedonian Yugoslav Partisan and one of the organizers of the communist-led resistance in the Bitola area during World War II, and was declared a People's Hero of Yugoslavia.

Biography 
He was born on 27 October 1920 in Lepensko village near Bitola, and his family originated from the village of Paroreio near Florina. He went on Faculty of Engineering in Belgrade in 1938. There he befriended Kuzman Josifovski Pitu. In 1939, he was elected for a member of the Communist Party of Yugoslavia. In 1940, he was elected for the secretary of the Local committee of the CPY in Bitola. After Yugoslavia was occupied by the Axis forces in 1941, Naumov worked on the organizing of an armed resistance against the Bulgarian occupation in Bitola area. In April 1942, he was one of the organizers of the Bitola partisan detachment "Pelister", consisting of 20 men. On 3 May, the detachment was discovered by the Bulgarian army near the village of Orehovo and was completely destroyed.

Bulgarian police discovered him on 12 September 1942 during an illegal meeting with Dimitar Bogoevski, near Bolno village. Surrounded and outnumbered, they ultimately killed themselves in order not to fall alive in their enemies' hands.

The house where Stiv was born and lived is now a memorial museum dedicated to him. There is also his monument in the center of Bitola.

See also
 List of people from Bitola

References 

1920 births
1942 deaths
People from Bitola Municipality
Yugoslav Partisans members
Yugoslav communists
Recipients of the Order of the People's Hero